Cutright Run is a stream in the U.S. state of West Virginia.

Cutright Run was named after John Cutright, an early settler.

See also
List of rivers of West Virginia

References

Rivers of Upshur County, West Virginia
Rivers of West Virginia